WOLA (1380 AM) is a radio station broadcasting a Spanish adult contemporary format. Licensed to Barranquitas, Puerto Rico, the station serves the Puerto Rico area.  The station is currently owned by Centro Media Group, through licensee Radio Procer, Inc.

History
The station went on the air as WEAH on February 23, 1976. On October 24, 1983, the station changed its call sign to the current WOLA.

Translator stations

References

External links

OLA (AM)
Barranquitas, Puerto Rico
1976 establishments in Puerto Rico
Radio stations established in 1976